Keeranur  is a sub village of No 3 Komarapalayam in Vennandur revenue block in Namakkal district of Tamil Nadu.

Places
TNEB
Vetri Vikaas Boys Higher Secondary School
Vetri Vikaas Girls Higher Secondary School

References

Vennandur block
Villages in Namakkal district